Szóvárhegy is the Hungarian name for two villages in Romania:

 Picleu village, Brusturi Commune, Bihor County
 Almașu Mic village, Sârbi Commune, Bihor County